The 25th World Science Fiction Convention (Worldcon), also known as NyCon 3 or Nycon 3, was held on 31 August–4 September 1967 at the Statler Hilton Hotel in New York City, United States.

The chairmen were Ted White and Dave Van Arnam.

Participants 

Attendance was approximately 1,500.

Guests of Honor 

 Lester del Rey (pro)
 Bob Tucker (fan)
 Harlan Ellison (toastmaster)

Awards

1967 Hugo Awards 

 Best Novel: The Moon Is a Harsh Mistress by Robert A. Heinlein
 Best Novelette: "The Last Castle" by Jack Vance
 Best Short Story: "Neutron Star" by Larry Niven
 Best Professional Artist: Jack Gaughan
 Best Dramatic Presentation: "The Menagerie" (Star Trek)
 Best Professional Magazine: if
 Best Fanzine: Niekas edited by Ed Meskys and Felice Rolfe
 Best Fan Artist: Jack Gaughan
 Best Fan Writer: Alexei Panshin

Other awards 

 Special Award: CBS Television for 21st Century

See also 

 Hugo Award
 Science fiction
 Speculative fiction
 World Science Fiction Society
 Worldcon

References

External links 

 NESFA.org: The Long List
 NESFA.org: 1967 convention notes 

1967 conferences
1967 in New York City
1967 in the United States
Science fiction conventions in the United States
Worldcon